Little Lunch may refer to:

 Recess (break)
 Little Lunch (TV series), a 2015 Australian television series